Lake Kaweah is a reservoir near Lemon Cove in Tulare County, California. The lake is formed by Terminus Dam on the Kaweah River. The river originates in the Sierra Nevada and drains about  into Lake Kaweah before flowing towards the San Joaquin Valley. From Lake Kaweah, the river flows toward the city of Visalia, splitting into the Kaweah River and St. Johns River as it flows west into the Tulare Lakebed. A project to raise the lake  was completed in 2004. The lake now impounds an additional  and downstream flood protection to downstream communities and agricultural land has been increased.

Because its primary purpose is flood control, Lake Kaweah is maintained at a very low level or empty for most of the year, and generally only fills between May and June. Due to the limited capacity of the reservoir, large spills of floodwater often occur after large rain storms. In the winter, water is released as quickly as possible to ensure room for floodwater which can then be released at a controlled rate. During floods in 1997, the reservoir filled and emptied twice because of this operational regimen.

At the upper end of Lake Kaweah is the small town of Three Rivers, which sits at the entrance to Sequoia National Park.

See also
 Lime Kiln Creek
 List of dams and reservoirs in California
 List of lakes in California

References

External links
 U.S. Army Corps of Engineers - Lake Kaweah
 

Reservoirs in Tulare County, California
Geography of the San Joaquin Valley
Populated places in the Sierra Nevada (United States)
Reservoirs in California
Reservoirs in Northern California